National Route 206 is a national highway of Japan connecting Nagasaki, Nagasaki and Sasebo, Nagasaki in Japan, with a total length of 72.6 km (45.11 mi).

References

National highways in Japan
Roads in Nagasaki Prefecture